Obech is a village in Belarus in the district of Brest, located at ,  SW of Minsk. It was formerly a Jewish shtetl.

Villages in Belarus